The following events occurred in November 1924:

November 1, 1924 (Saturday)
A general election was held in Cuba. Gerardo Machado was elected president of Cuba under the Liberal-Popular Coalition banner.
Éamon de Valera was sentenced to a month in prison for entering Ulster illegally. 
Club Sport Colombia was founded in Paraguay.
Born: Süleyman Demirel, politician, in İslamköy, Turkey (d. 2015)

November 2, 1924 (Sunday)
Uruguay and Argentina played to a scoreless draw in the South American Championship of football and won its fifth Copa América by finishing the tournament with the most points.

November 3, 1924 (Monday)
Feng Yuxiang's troops entered Tianjin.
Calvin Coolidge and John W. Davis made their final appeals to voters with radio addresses on the eve of the presidential election.
The League of Nations opened its first session of the International Opium Conference, addressing the issue of opium smoking and addiction.

November 4, 1924 (Tuesday)
Calvin Coolidge of the Republican Party was elected to a second term in the U.S. presidential election, as Democratic opponent John W. Davis nearly swept the South but was unable to carry any other states. Third-party candidate Robert M. La Follette won his home state of Wisconsin and its 13 electoral votes, while Coolidge had 382 electoral votes and Davis had 136.
A violent encounter took place in Rome during parades commemorating the sixth anniversary of the Italian Armistice. Accounts vary as to what happened, but it appears that anti-Fascist war veterans objected to attempts by Blackshirts to join their march. Angry words were exchanged, fights broke out and a ceremony in the Piazza Venezia was called off. The incident became another scandal for Benito Mussolini's government as even members of his inner circle were appalled at what was seen as an attack on Italy's war veterans. 
Stanley Baldwin became Prime Minister of the United Kingdom again.
Died: Gabriel Fauré, 79, French composer

November 5, 1924 (Wednesday)
Former Chinese emperor Puyi was expelled from the Forbidden City and all Manchu titles were abolished.

November 6, 1924 (Thursday)
Nikola Pašić became Prime Minister of Yugoslavia for the second time.
The A. A. Milne poetry collection When We Were Very Young was published.
Winston Churchill was named Chancellor of the Exchequer, a surprising move on the part of Stanley Baldwin as Churchill had no experience in finance.
Born: Harlon Block, U.S. marine and flag raiser on Iwo Jima, in Yorktown, Texas (d. 1945); Jeanette Schmid, notable whistler, in Volary, Sudetenland, Czechoslovakia (d. 2005)

November 7, 1924 (Friday)
Germany announced its first balanced budget since the war.
The Ignaz Seipel government resigned in Austria.

November 8, 1924 (Saturday)

 The Sherlock Holmes short story "The Adventure of the Illustrious Client" by Sir Arthur Conan Doyle was published for the first time in Collier's Weekly in the United States.
In Honolulu, Hawaii, Korean nationalist Syngman Rhee announced plans for a new Korean independence movement.
Born: Johnny Bower, hockey player, in Prince Albert, Saskatchewan, Canada (d. 2017)
Died: Mike Merlo, 44, Chicago political figure (cancer)

November 9, 1924 (Sunday)
Soviet troops massed intimidatingly on the border with Estonia on the eve of the trial of the 149 beginning.
The silent drama film He Who Gets Slapped, starring Lon Chaney, was released.
Born: Robert Frank, photographer, in Zürich, Switzerland (d. 2019)
Died: Henry Cabot Lodge, 74, American Senator and historian

November 10, 1924 (Monday)
Ranch property belonging to Mexican president-elect Plutarco Elías Calles was expropriated by the state in accordance with agrarian laws.

November 11, 1924 (Tuesday)
The Martin Beck Theatre (now the Al Hirschfeld Theatre) opened in New York City.
Born: Evelyn Wawryshyn, baseball player, in Tyndall, Manitoba, Canada (alive in 2021)

November 12, 1924 (Wednesday)
A new session of Italian parliament opened with 185 opposition members absent in protest. This boycott became known as the Aventine Secession.
The Tientsin Conference begins with powerful warlords meeting to discuss the future government of China and hopefully reconcile with Sun Yat-sen's  rival government in Canton.

November 13, 1924 (Thursday)
Mussolini introduced a bill allowing women to vote in national elections in Italy.
Born: Motoo Kimura, population geneticist, in Okazaki, Japan (d. 1994); Edward F. Welch, Jr., admiral, in Barrington, Rhode Island (d. 2008)

November 14, 1924 (Friday)
In New York City, the explorers Roald Amundsen and Lincoln Ellsworth announced plans for a joint polar flight expedition in 1925.
Died: Joe Quest, 71, American baseball player

November 15, 1924 (Saturday)
France clashed with the United States over a letter from reparations agent Seymour Parker Gilbert stating that Britain and France were not entitled to collect a tax of 26 percent on German imports as part of reparations payments under the Dawes Plan. France contended that the import tax had nothing to do with the Plan.
The United Kingdom angered Japan at the International Opium Conference in Geneva when British delegate Malcolm Delevingne said that Great Britain could not habitually recognize import certificates, because they were often diverted on the way to the country of purchase for illicit purposes by high officials in one far eastern country that he "preferred not to name."

November 16, 1924 (Sunday)
French troops evacuated the right bank of the Rhine between Cologne and Koblenz.
Japan essentially quit the International Opium Conference, claiming the proposed agreement was discriminatory against them and that the British delegation had offended Japan's honour.
Born: Mel Patton, track and field athlete, in Los Angeles (d. 2014)

November 17, 1924 (Monday)
The Canadian province of Ontario said it would build a "dry navy" to co-operate with American Prohibition enforcement agents unless the Canadian federal government did more to stop rum-running.
The film A Sainted Devil, starring Rudolph Valentino, was released.

November 18, 1924 (Tuesday)
Britain asked the League of Nations for an indefinite postponement of any further discussion on the Geneva Protocol.

November 19, 1924 (Wednesday)
Hollywood producer Thomas H. Ince died at his estate in California, two days after leaving a gathering attended by many celebrities aboard William Randolph Hearst's private yacht, the Oneida. The cause of death was officially given as a heart attack, but wild rumors circulated that he had been shot or somehow otherwise fatally afflicted under circumstances that were covered up. A 2001 film, The Cat's Meow, is based on the rumors.
The legislature of the Philippines passed a resolution calling for complete independence from the United States.
Born: William Russell, actor, in Sunderland, Tyne and Wear, England (alive in 2021); J. D. Sumner, singer, songwriter and music promoter, in Lakeland, Florida (d. 1998)
Died: Thomas H. Ince, 42, film producer; Sir Lee Stack, 55 or 56, British Governor-General of Anglo-Egyptian Sudan (assassinated)

November 20, 1924 (Thursday)
Rudolf Ramek became Chancellor of Austria.
Born: Benoit Mandelbrot, mathematician, in Warsaw, Poland (d. 2010)

November 21, 1924 (Friday)
Britain's new Stanley Baldwin government scrapped the commercial treaties that Ramsay MacDonald's Labour government had negotiated with the Soviet Union.
Born: Warren Hacker, baseball player, in Marissa, Illinois (d. 2002)
Died: Florence Harding, 64, First Lady of the United States

November 22, 1924 (Saturday)
Fethi Okyar became the 2nd Prime Minister of Turkey.
The British government sent a message to Egyptian Prime Minister Saad Zaghloul demanding complete satisfaction in the matter of the assassination of Governor-General Sir Lee Stack, including punishment of those responsible and a payment of £500,000 in compensation. Britain blamed the assassination on the Egyptian government's failure to take steps to suppress anti-British agitation.
Born: Geraldine Page, actress, in Kirksville, Missouri (d. 1987)

November 23, 1924 (Sunday)
Embattled Italian leader Benito Mussolini apologized for the events in Rome on November 4 and promised to take steps to keep his Blackshirts under control.
Born: Anita Linda, actress, in Pasay, Philippines (d. 2020)

November 24, 1924 (Monday)
Saad Zaghloul was ousted as Egyptian Prime Minister over the Sir Lee Stack assassination. He was succeeded by Ahmad Ziwar Pasha.
Born: Joanne Winter, baseball player, in Chicago (d. 1996)

November 25, 1924 (Tuesday)
Charlie Chaplin married his second wife, Lita Grey, in Empalme, Mexico.
Radio stations in the United States broadcast an "hour of silence" between 10 and 11 p.m., setting it aside for international broadcasting tests. Listeners as far west as Duluth, Minnesota reported being able to hear broadcasting from England, France and Spain.
Born: Takaaki Yoshimoto, poet, critic and philosopher, in Tokyo (d. 2012)

November 26, 1924 (Wednesday)
The Mongolian People's Republic was proclaimed.

November 27, 1924 (Thursday)
The verdicts in the trial of the 149 were read in Estonia. 7 were acquitted and all the others were sentenced to varying terms of either prison or forced labour.
The first Macy's Thanksgiving Day Parade was held in New York City.

November 28, 1924 (Friday)
Mussolini's newspaper Il Popolo d'Italia warned that civil war would break out unless the opposition ceased its "campaign of defamation."
Born: Dennis Brutus, activist, educator, journalist and poet, in Salisbury, Southern Rhodesia (d. 2009)

November 29, 1924 (Saturday)
A public broadcasting station, NHK (Japan Broadcasting Corporation) was founded in Japan, as predecessor name was Tokyo Broadcasting Station.  
The Army–Navy Game was won by Army 12-0 in Baltimore.  U.S. president Calvin Coolidge was among the 80,000 in attendance.  
In the 12th Grey Cup of Canadian football, Queen's University beat the Toronto Balmy Beach Beachers 11-3 at Varsity Stadium.
The Montreal Forum opened in Canada.
Born: Irv Noren, baseball player, in Jamestown, New York (d. 2019)
Died: Giacomo Puccini, 66, Italian composer

November 30, 1924 (Sunday)
The 1924 NFL season officially ended with the Cleveland Bulldogs atop the standings.
Plutarco Elías Calles was inaugurated as the 40th president of Mexico. The National Stadium in Mexico City was packed for the event that only lasted fifteen minutes.
Editor of British newspaper The People Hannen Swaffer recounted a séance he attended along with Arthur Conan Doyle, Sir Robert McAlpine and others. Swaffer said that the medium contacted Lord Northcliffe, who admitted that Doyle was right about life beyond the grave. "I distrusted your judgement, but I see now how wrong I was", the spirit voice of Northcliffe was quoted as saying.  
Born: Allan Sherman, comedy writer and song parodist, in Chicago (d. 1973)

References

1924
1924-11
1924-11